Dinamo Polyvalent Hall is a multi-purpose indoor arena in Bucharest, Romania. It is used by the active departments of CS Dinamo București.

References

Indoor arenas in Romania
Buildings and structures in Bucharest
Handball venues in Romania
Volleyball venues in Romania
Basketball venues in Romania
Sports venues in Bucharest